In botany and dendrology, a rhizome is a modified subterranean plant stem that sends out roots and shoots from its nodes. Rhizomes are also called creeping rootstalks or just rootstalks. Rhizomes develop from axillary buds and grow horizontally. The rhizome also retains the ability to allow new shoots to grow upwards.

A rhizome is the main stem of the plant that runs underground horizontally. A stolon is similar to a rhizome, but a stolon sprouts from an existing stem, has long internodes, and generates new shoots at the end, such as in the strawberry plant. In general, rhizomes have short internodes, send out roots from the bottom of the nodes, and generate new upward-growing shoots from the top of the nodes.

A stem tuber is a thickened part of a rhizome or stolon that has been enlarged for use as a storage organ. In general, a tuber is high in starch, e.g. the potato, which is a modified stolon. The term "tuber" is often used imprecisely and is sometimes applied to plants with rhizomes.

If a rhizome is separated each piece may be able to give rise to a new plant. The plant uses the rhizome to store starches, proteins, and other nutrients. These nutrients become useful for the plant when new shoots must be formed or when the plant dies back for the winter. This is a process known as vegetative reproduction and is used by farmers and gardeners to propagate certain plants. This also allows for lateral spread of grasses like bamboo and bunch grasses. Examples of plants that are propagated this way include hops, asparagus, ginger, irises, lily of the valley, cannas, and sympodial orchids.

Stored rhizomes are subject to bacterial and fungal infections, making them unsuitable for replanting and greatly diminishing stocks. However, rhizomes can also be produced artificially from tissue cultures. The ability to easily grow rhizomes from tissue cultures leads to better stocks for replanting and greater yields. The plant hormones ethylene and jasmonic acid have been found to help induce and regulate the growth of rhizomes, specifically in rhubarb. Ethylene that was applied externally was found to affect internal ethylene levels, allowing easy manipulations of ethylene concentrations. Knowledge of how to use these hormones to induce rhizome growth could help farmers and biologists to produce plants grown from rhizomes, and more easily cultivate and grow better plants.

Some plants have rhizomes that grow above ground or that lie at the soil surface, including some Iris species, and ferns, whose spreading stems are rhizomes. Plants with underground rhizomes include gingers, bamboo, snake plant, the Venus flytrap, Chinese lantern, western poison-oak, hops, and Alstroemeria, and the weeds Johnson grass, Bermuda grass, and purple nut sedge. Rhizomes generally form a single layer, but in giant horsetails, can be multi-tiered.

Many rhizomes have culinary value, and some, such as zhe'ergen, are commonly consumed raw. Some rhizomes that are used directly in cooking include ginger, turmeric, galangal, fingerroot, and lotus.

See also
Aspen
Corm
Mycorrhiza
Tuber
Bulb

References

External links
 
The Rhizome Collective for sustainable living

Plant anatomy
Plant physiology
Plant reproduction